The Cairns Bulletin was an independent newspaper in circulation in Cairns. It covered the Cairns area from Palm Cove in the north to Gordonvale in the south with a distribution of 38,000 copies, reaching a population of 90,000+ residents. It was available in a print edition and online.

External links
 Official web site

Cairns, Queensland
Defunct newspapers published in Queensland